The 1934 Ole Miss Rebels football team represented the University of Mississippi during the 1934 college football season.

Schedule

Roster
E Buster Poole, So.

References

Ole Miss
Ole Miss Rebels football seasons
Ole Miss Rebels football